Four-time defending champion Roger Federer defeated Andy Murray in the final,  6–2, 7–5, 6–2 to win the men's singles tennis title at the 2008 US Open. It was his fifth consecutive US Open title and 13th major title overall, as well as his only successful title defense in majors that year (after losing at the Australian Open and Wimbledon). He moved to second place on the all time men's singles Grand Slam wins list, passing Roy Emerson.

Murray became the first British man to reach a major final since Greg Rusedski at the 1997 US Open, and was attempting to become the first British man to win a major title since Fred Perry in 1936. Murray would eventually achieve the latter by winning the US Open title four years later.

Rafael Nadal was attempting to become the first man to achieve the Surface Slam (winning majors on clay, grass and hard courts in the same calendar year), having already won the French Open and Wimbledon titles. He also could have become the first man to win the French Open, Wimbledon and US Open since Rod Laver in 1969, but lost to Murray in the semifinals. He would eventually do it two years later.

This was Juan Martín del Potro's first major appearance as a seeded player. He lost in the quarterfinals against Murray to end a 23-match winning streak. He would go on to win the title the following year. Another future champion, Marin Čilić, appeared in the main draw of the US Open for the first time.

This was the last major for 2002 Australian Open champion and former world No. 7 Thomas Johansson.

Seeds

Qualifying draw

Draw

Finals

Top half

Section 1

Section 2

Section 3

Section 4

Bottom half

Section 5

Section 6

Section 7

Section 8

References

External links
 Association of Tennis Professionals (ATP) – 2008 US Open Men's Singles draw
2008 US Open – Men's draws and results at the International Tennis Federation

Men's Singles
US Open (tennis) by year – Men's singles